Main page: List of Canadian plants by family

Families:
A | B | C | D | E | F | G | H | I J K | L | M | N | O | P Q | R | S | T | U V W | X Y Z

Radulaceae 

 Radula auriculata
 Radula complanata
 Radula obconica
 Radula obtusiloba
 Radula prolifera
 Radula tenax

Ranunculaceae 

 Aconitum columbianum — Columbia monkshood
 Aconitum delphiniifolium — larkspur-leaf monkshood
 Aconitum x bicolor
 Actaea elata — tall bugbane
 Actaea pachypoda — white baneberry
 Actaea racemosa — black bugbane
 Actaea rubra — red baneberry
 Actaea x ludovici
 Anemone canadensis — Canada anemone
 Anemone cylindrica — long-fruited anemone
 Anemone drummondii — Drummond's anemone
 Anemone lithophila — Little Belt Mountain thimbleweed
 Anemone lyallii — little mountain thimbleweed
 Anemone multiceps — Porcupine River thimbleweed
 Anemone multifida — Hudson Bay anemone
 Anemone narcissiflora — narcissus thimbleweed
 Anemone parviflora — smallflower anemone
 Anemone piperi — Piper's anemone
 Anemone quinquefolia — wood anemone
 Anemone richardsonii — yellow anemone
 Anemone virginiana — Virginia anemone
 Aquilegia brevistyla — smallflower columbine
 Aquilegia canadensis — wild columbine
 Aquilegia flavescens — yellow columbine
 Aquilegia formosa — crimson columbine
 Aquilegia jonesii — Jones' columbine
 Caltha leptosepala — slender-sepal marsh-marigold
 Caltha natans — floating marsh-marigold
 Caltha palustris — marsh-marigold
 Clematis columbiana — Columbian virgin's-bower
 Clematis hirsutissima — clustered leather-flower
 Clematis ligusticifolia — western virgin's-bower
 Clematis occidentalis — purple clematis
 Clematis virginiana — Virginia virgin's-bower
 Coptis aspleniifolia — spleenwort-leaf goldthread
 Coptis trifolia — goldthread
 Delphinium bicolor — flathead larkspur
 Delphinium brachycentrum — northern larkspur
 Delphinium burkei — meadow larkspur
 Delphinium carolinianum — Carolina larkspur
 Delphinium distichum — two-spike larkspur
 Delphinium glareosum — rockslide larkspur
 Delphinium glaucum — pale larkspur
 Delphinium menziesii — Puget Sound larkspur
 Delphinium nuttallianum — Nuttall's larkspur
 Delphinium sutherlandii — Sutherland's larkspur
 Delphinium x occidentale — duncecap larkspur
 Enemion biternatum — false rue-anemone
 Enemion savilei — Queen Charlotte Island false rue-anemone
 Anemone hepatica — roundlobe hepatica
 Hydrastis canadensis — goldenseal
 Kumlienia cooleyae — Cooley's buttercup
 Myosurus apetalus — bristly mousetail
 Myosurus minimus — eastern mousetail
 Pulsatilla occidentalis — western pasqueflower
 Pulsatilla nuttalliana — American pasqueflower
 Ranunculus abortivus — kidneyleaf buttercup
 Ranunculus acris — tall buttercup
 Ranunculus alismifolius — water-plantain buttercup
 Ranunculus allenii — Allen's buttercup
 Ranunculus ambigens — water-plantain spearwort
 Ranunculus aquatilis — white water buttercup
 Ranunculus californicus — California buttercup
 Ranunculus cardiophyllus — heartleaf buttercup
 Ranunculus cymbalaria — seaside crowfoot
 Ranunculus eschscholtzii — Eschscholtz' buttercup
 Ranunculus eximius — tundra buttercup
 Ranunculus fascicularis — early buttercup
 Ranunculus ficaria — figroot buttercup
 Ranunculus flabellaris — yellow water-crowfoot
 Ranunculus flammula — lesser spearwort
 Ranunculus glaberrimus — sagebrush buttercup
 Ranunculus gmelinii — small yellow water-crowfoot
 Ranunculus hexasepalus — Queen Charlotte Island buttercup
 Ranunculus hispidus — hispid buttercup
 Ranunculus hyperboreus — arctic buttercup
 Ranunculus inamoenus — graceful buttercup
 Ranunculus karelinii — Karelin's arctic buttercup
 Ranunculus lapponicus — Lapland buttercup
 Ranunculus longirostris — eastern white water-crowfoot
 Ranunculus macounii — Macoun's buttercup
 Ranunculus nivalis — snowy buttercup
 Ranunculus occidentalis — western buttercup
 Ranunculus orthorhynchus — bird's-food buttercup
 Ranunculus pallasii — Pallas' buttercup
 Ranunculus pedatifidus — northern buttercup
 Ranunculus pensylvanicus — bristly crowfoot
 Ranunculus pygmaeus — dwarf buttercup
 Ranunculus recurvatus — hooked crowfoot
 Ranunculus rhomboideus — prairie buttercup
 Ranunculus sabinei — Sardinian buttercup
 Ranunculus sceleratus — cursed crowfoot
 Ranunculus suksdorfii — Suksdorf's buttercup
 Ranunculus sulphureus — sulphur buttercup
 Ranunculus trichophyllus — northeastern white water-crowfoot
 Ranunculus turneri — Turner's buttercup
 Ranunculus uncinatus — woodland buttercup
 Ranunculus verecundus — timberline buttercup
 Ranunculus x spitzbergensis
 Thalictrum alpinum — alpine meadowrue
 Thalictrum dasycarpum — purple meadowrue
 Thalictrum dioicum — early meadowrue
 Thalictrum occidentale — western meadowrue
 Thalictrum pubescens — tall meadowrue
 Thalictrum revolutum — waxleaf meadowrue
 Thalictrum sparsiflorum — few-flower meadowrue
 Thalictrum thalictroides — windflower
 Thalictrum venulosum — veined meadowrue
 Trautvetteria caroliniensis — Carolina tassel-rue
 Trollius laxus — spreading globeflower

Rhamnaceae 

 Ceanothus americanus — New Jersey tea
 Ceanothus herbaceus — prairie redroot
 Ceanothus sanguineus — Oregon-tea
 Ceanothus velutinus — tobacco ceanothus
 Frangula purshiana — Cascara false buckthorn
 Rhamnus alnifolia — alderleaf buckthorn

Rhytidiaceae 

 Rhytidium rugosum — golden glade-moss

Ricciaceae 

 Riccia beyrichiana
 Riccia bifurca
 Riccia cavernosa
 Riccia fluitans
 Riccia frostii
 Riccia sorocarpa
 Riccia sullivantii
 Ricciocarpos natans

Rosaceae 

 Agrimonia gryposepala — tall hairy groovebur
 Agrimonia parviflora — swamp agrimony
 Agrimonia pubescens — soft groovebur
 Agrimonia striata — woodland agrimony
 Alchemilla alpina — mountain lady's-mantle
 Alchemilla filicaulis — thinstem lady's-mantle
 Alchemilla glomerulans — clustered lady's-mantle
 Amelanchier alnifolia — saskatoonberry
 Amelanchier arborea — downy serviceberry
 Amelanchier bartramiana — Bartram's shadbush
 Amelanchier canadensis — oblongleaf serviceberry
 Amelanchier fernaldii — Fernald's serviceberry
 Amelanchier humilis — running serviceberry
 Amelanchier interior — shadbush
 Amelanchier laevis — Allegheny serviceberry
 Amelanchier sanguinea — roundleaf shadbush
 Amelanchier stolonifera — running serviceberry
 Amelanchier × intermedia
 Amelanchier × neglecta
 Amelanchier × quinti-martii
 Argentina anserina — silverweed
 Argentina egedei — Eged's cinquefoil
 Aruncus dioicus — common goat's-beard
 Chamaerhodos erecta — rose chamærhodos
 Comarum palustre — marsh cinquefoil
 Crataegus beata — Dunbar's hawthorn
 Crataegus brainerdii — Brainerd's hawthorn
 Crataegus calpodendron — pear hawthorn
 Crataegus chrysocarpa — fineberry hawthorn
 Crataegus compacta — clustered hawthorn
 Crataegus compta — adorned hawthorn
 Crataegus crus-galli — cockspur hawthorn
 Crataegus dilatata — broadleaf hawthorn
 Crataegus dissona — northern hawthorn
 Crataegus dodgei — Dodge's hawthorn
 Crataegus douglasii — Douglas' hawthorn
 Crataegus flabellata — fanleaf hawthorn
 Crataegus fluviatilis
 Crataegus fulleriana — Fuller's hawthorn
 Crataegus holmesiana — Holmes' hawthorn
 Crataegus intricata — Copenhagen hawthorn
 Crataegus iracunda — stolon-bearing hawthorn
 Crataegus irrasa — Blanchard's hawthorn
 Crataegus jonesae — Miss Jones' hawthorn
 Crataegus knieskerniana — Knieskern's hawthorn
 Crataegus lemingtonensis — Lemington hawthorn
 Crataegus lumaria — roundleaf hawthorn
 Crataegus macrosperma — bigstem hawthorn
 Crataegus margarettiae — Margarett's hawthorn
 Crataegus mollis — downy hawthorn
 Crataegus nitida — glossy hawthorn
 Crataegus nitidula — Ontario hawthorn
 Crataegus okennonii — O'Kennon's hawthorn
 Crataegus pedicellata — scarlet hawthorn
 Crataegus pennsylvanica — Pennsylvania hawthorn
 Crataegus perjucunda — pearthorn
 Crataegus persimilis — plumleaf hawthorn
 Crataegus phippsii — Phipps' hawthorn
 Crataegus pringlei — Pringle's hawthorn
 Crataegus prona — Illinois hawthorn
 Crataegus pruinosa — waxy-fruit hawthorn
 Crataegus punctata — dotted hawthorn
 Crataegus robinsonii — Robinson's hawthorn
 Crataegus scabrida — rough hawthorn
 Crataegus schuettei — Schuette's hawthorn
 Crataegus submollis — Québec hawthorn
 Crataegus suborbiculata — Caughuawaga hawthorn
 Crataegus succulenta — fleshy hawthorn
 Crataegus suksdorfii — Suksdorf's hawthorn
 Crataegus x anomala
 Crataegus x kingstonensis
 Dalibarda repens — robin-run-away
 Dasiphora fruticosa — shrubby cinquefoil
 Dryas drummondii — yellow mountain-avens
 Dryas integrifolia — entire-leaved mountain-avens
 Dryas octopetala — eight-petal mountain-avens
 Dryas x sundermannii
 Dryas x wyssiana
 Filipendula rubra — queen-of-the-prairie
 Fragaria chiloensis — Chilean strawberry
 Fragaria crinita — Pacific strawberry
 Fragaria vesca — woodland strawberry
 Fragaria virginiana — Virginia strawberry
 Fragaria x ananassa
 Geum aleppicum — yellow avens
 Geum calthifolium — caltha-leaf avens
 Geum canadense — white avens
 Geum glaciale — glacier avens
 Geum laciniatum — rough avens
 Geum macrophyllum — largeleaf avens
 Geum peckii — mountain avens
 Geum rivale — purple avens
 Geum rossii — Ross' avens
 Geum triflorum — prairie-smoke
 Geum vernum — spring avens
 Geum virginianum — pale avens
 Geum x aurantiacum
 Geum x macranthum
 Geum x pulchrum
 Holodiscus discolor — creambush oceanspray
 Luetkea pectinata — segmented lütkea
 Malus coronaria — sweet crabapple
 Malus fusca — Pacific crabapple
 Malus glaucescens — sweet crabapple
 Oemleria cerasiformis — osoberry
 Aronia floribunda — purple chokeberry
 Aronia melanocarpa — black chokeberry
 Aronia pyrifolia — red chokeberry
 Physocarpus capitatus — Pacific ninebark
 Physocarpus malvaceus — mallowleaf ninebark
 Physocarpus opulifolius — eastern ninebark
 Potentilla arguta — tall cinquefoil
 Potentilla biennis — biennial cinquefoil
 Potentilla biflora — two-flower cinquefoil
 Potentilla bipinnatifida — tansy cinquefoil
 Potentilla canadensis — Canada cinquefoil
 Potentilla concinna — red cinquefoil
 Potentilla diversifolia — mountain meadow cinquefoil
 Potentilla drummondii — Drummond's cinquefoil
 Potentilla effusa — branched cinquefoil
 Potentilla elegans — elegant cinquefoil
 Potentilla fissa — bigflower cinquefoil
 Potentilla flabellifolia — fanleaf cinquefoil
 Potentilla flabelliformis
 Potentilla glandulosa — sticky cinquefoil
 Potentilla gracilis — fanleaf cinquefoil
 Potentilla hippiana — horse cinquefoil
 Potentilla hookeriana — Hooker's cinquefoil
 Potentilla macounii — Macoun's cinquefoil
 Potentilla multifida — divided cinquefoil
 Potentilla nana — arctic cinquefoil
 Potentilla neumanniana — spring cinquefoil
 Potentilla nivea — snow cinquefoil
 Potentilla norvegica — Norwegian cinquefoil
 Potentilla ovina — sheep cinquefoil
 Potentilla paradoxa — bushy cinquefoil
 Potentilla pectinisecta — combleaf cinquefoil
 Potentilla pensylvanica — Pennsylvania cinquefoil
 Potentilla plattensis — Platte River cinquefoil
 Potentilla pulchella — pretty cinquefoil
 Potentilla pulcherrima — soft cinquefoil
 Potentilla rivalis — brook cinquefoil
 Potentilla rubricaulis — Rocky Mountain cinquefoil
 Potentilla simplex — common cinquefoil
 Potentilla subjuga — Colorado cinquefoil
 Potentilla tabernaemontani — spotted cinquefoil
 Potentilla uniflora — one-flower cinquefoil
 Potentilla vahliana — Vahl's cinquefoil
 Potentilla villosa — northern cinquefoil
 Prunus americana — American plum
 Prunus emarginata — bitter cherry
 Prunus nigra — Canada plum
 Prunus pensylvanica — fire cherry
 Prunus pumila — sand cherry
 Prunus serotina — wild black cherry
 Prunus virginiana — choke cherry
 Purshia tridentata — antelope bitterbrush
 Rosa acicularis — prickly rose
 Rosa arkansana — prairie rose
 Rosa blanda — smooth rose
 Rosa carolina — Carolina rose
 Rosa gymnocarpa — wood rose
 Rosa nitida — shining rose
 Rosa nutkana — Nootka rose
 Rosa palustris — swamp rose
 Rosa pisocarpa — clustered rose
 Rosa setigera — prairie rose
 Rosa virginiana — Virginia rose
 Rosa woodsii — Woods' rose
 Rosa x dulcissima
 Rubus adenocaulis — glandstem dewberry
 Rubus adjacens — peaty dewberry
 Rubus alaskensis — Alaska blackberry
 Rubus allegheniensis — Allegheny blackberry
 Rubus alumnus — blackberry
 Rubus arcticus — nagoonberry
 Rubus arcuans — wand dewberry
 Rubus arenicola — sand-dwelling dewberry
 Rubus baileyanus — Bailey's dewberry
 Rubus bellobatus — Kittatinny blackberry
 Rubus biformispinus — pasture dewberry
 Rubus canadensis — smooth blackberry
 Rubus chamaemorus — cloudberry
 Rubus elegantulus — showy blackberry
 Rubus flagellaris — northern dewberry
 Rubus fraternalis — northeastern dewberry
 Rubus frondisentis — leafy blackberry
 Rubus frondosus — Yankee blackberry
 Rubus glandicaulis — glandstem blackberry
 Rubus heterophyllus — ecotone blackberry
 Rubus hispidus — bristly dewberry
 Rubus idaeus — American red raspberry
 Rubus jacens — spreading dewberry
 Rubus junceus — herbaceous blackberry
 Rubus kennedyanus — Kennedy's blackberry
 Rubus lasiococcus — hairy-fruit smooth dewberry
 Rubus leucodermis — white-stemmed raspberry
 Rubus mananensis — Grand Manan dewberry
 Rubus michiganensis — Michigan dewberry
 Rubus multiformis — variable blackberry
 Rubus navus — grand lake blackberry
 Rubus nivalis — snow dwarf bramble
 Rubus novocaesarius — Tuckahoe dewberry
 Rubus occidentalis — black raspberry
 Rubus odoratus — purple-flowering raspberry
 Rubus ortivus — Mt. Desert Island blackberry
 Rubus paganus — St. Lawrence dewberry
 Rubus particeps — Kingston dewberry
 Rubus parviflorus — thimbleberry
 Rubus pedatus — five-leaf dwarf bramble
 Rubus pensilvanicus — Pennsylvania blackberry
 Rubus pergratus — upland blackberry
 Rubus pervarius — Westminster dewberry
 Rubus plicatifolius — plaitleaf dewberry
 Rubus provincialis — groundberry
 Rubus pubescens — dwarf red raspberry
 Rubus pugnax — pugnacious blackberry
 Rubus recurvans — recurved blackberry
 Rubus recurvicaulis — arching dewberry
 Rubus regionalis — Wisconsin dewberry
 Rubus roribaccus — velvet-leaved dewberry
 Rubus russeus — Halifax blackberry
 Rubus segnis — Nova Scotia dewberry
 Rubus semisetosus — New England blackberry
 Rubus setosus — small bristleberry
 Rubus severus — harsh dewberry
 Rubus signatus — sphagnum dewberry
 Rubus spectabilis — salmonberry
 Rubus suppar — New Glasgow dewberry
 Rubus tardatus — wet-thicket dewberry
 Rubus trifrons — dewberry
 Rubus ursinus — California blackberry
 Rubus uvidus — Kalamazoo dewberry
 Rubus vermontanus — Green Mountain blackberry
 Rubus weatherbyi — Weatherby's dewberry
 Rubus wheeleri — Wheeler's blackberry
 Rubus x fraseri
 Rubus x paracaulis
 Sanguisorba annua — prairie burnet
 Sanguisorba canadensis — Canada burnet
 Sanguisorba menziesii — Menzies' burnet
 Sanguisorba occidentalis — annual burnet
 Sanguisorba officinalis — great burnet
 Sibbaldia procumbens — Arizona cinquefoil
 Sibbaldiopsis tridentata — three-toothed cinquefoil
 Sorbus americana — American mountain-ash
 Sorbus decora — northern mountain-ash
 Sorbus groenlandica — Greenland mountain-ash
 Sorbus scopulina — Greene's mountain-ash
 Sorbus sitchensis — Sitka mountain-ash
 Spiraea alba — narrowleaf white meadowsweet
 Spiraea betulifolia — white meadowsweet
 Spiraea douglasii — Douglas' spiræa
 Spiraea septentrionalis — northern meadowsweet
 Spiraea splendens — rose meadowsweet
 Spiraea stevenii — Steven's spiræa
 Spiraea tomentosa — hardhack spiræa
 Spiraea x pyramidata — pyramidal spiræa
 Waldsteinia fragarioides — barren strawberry
 x Sorbaronia arsenii
 x Sorbaronia jackii

Rubiaceae 

 Cephalanthus occidentalis — common buttonbush
 Galium aparine — catchweed bedstraw
 Galium asprellum — rough bedstraw
 Galium bifolium — low mountain bedstraw
 Galium boreale — northern bedstraw
 Galium brevipes — limestone swamp bedstraw
 Galium circaezans — licorice bedstraw
 Galium concinnum — shining bedstraw
 Galium kamtschaticum — boreal bedstraw
 Galium labradoricum — bog bedstraw
 Galium lanceolatum — Torrey's wild licorice
 Galium mexicanum — Mexican bedstraw
 Galium multiflorum — many-flower bedstraw
 Galium obtusum — bluntleaf bedstraw
 Galium palustre — marsh bedstraw
 Galium pilosum — hairy bedstraw
 Galium tinctorium — stiff marsh bedstraw
 Galium trifidum — small bedstraw
 Galium triflorum — sweetscent bedstraw
 Houstonia caerulea — Quaker-ladies
 Houstonia canadensis — Canada bluets
 Houstonia longifolia — longleaf bluets
 Mitchella repens — partridge-berry

Ruppiaceae 

 Ruppia cirrhosa — widgeon-grass
 Ruppia maritima — ditch-grass

Rutaceae 

 Ptelea trifoliata — common hoptree
 Zanthoxylum americanum — northern prickly-ash